The 2008–09 Lega Basket Serie A season, known as the Serie A TIM for sponsorship reasons, was the 87th season of the Lega Basket Serie A (LBA), the top tier professional basketball league division of the Italian basketball league system.

The regular season ran from September 30, 2007 to April 27, 2008, 16 teams played each other team in home and away matches. At the end of the regular season, the top 8 teams advanced to the championship play-off whilst the lowest ranked teams, GMAC Bologna and Snaidero Udine, were relegated to the Legadue.
	
The original number of teams was 18, but on September 20, 2008 the Federal Council of the Italian Basketball Federation (FIP) discovered administrative irregularities committed by Basket Napoli and UPEA Capo d'Orlando and decided to deny them professional licenses. The council also chose not to substitute them with any teams from LegADue, and at the same time decided to permanently reduce the number of teams in the top flight to 16.

Montepaschi Siena swept virtually all before them domestically, winning the SuperCoppa Italiana before the season and the Coppa Italia at midseason, losing in the league only once (at Fortitudo Bologna), and going unbeaten through the playoffs to claim their third straight title.

Teams

Renato Pasquali was sacked by La Fortezza Bologna after 6 matches and replaced by Matteo Boniciolli
Attilio Caja was sacked by Snaidero Udine after 7 matches and replaced by Romeo Sacchetti
Dragan Šakota was sacked by GMAC Bologna after 9 matches and replaced by Cesare Pancotto
Jasmin Repesa was sacked by Lottomatica Roma after 10 matches and replaced by Ferdinando Gentile

Supercoppa Italiana
The Italian Supercup is played as a single match before the start of the season between the previous year's Serie A champion and Coppa Italia winner (if a club wins both, the match instead pits the top two teams from the previous season's league). This season, the game, played September 30 in Siena, pitted two-time defending league champion Montepaschi Siena against Coppa Italia winner Air Avellino.

Terrell McIntyre was named MVP of the game.

Standings

At end of regular season:

Rieti penalized by 2 points for administrative irregularities.

Following the season, the owner of Fortitudo (GMAC) Bologna failed to make required payments to remain in the Italian professional ranks, and the club were further relegated to the country's third level, the nominally amateur Serie A Dilettanti. An appeal was unsuccessful.

Coppa Italia
The top eight teams at the halfway point of the regular season (15 rounds) competed in the Italian Cup, seeded according to their league placement at that time. The cup tournament was held at Futurshow Station in Casalecchio di Reno from February 19 to February 22, 2009, with top seed Montepaschi Siena winning the cup for the first time.

Playoffs
The playoffs, which began on May 18, featured the top eight teams from regular-season play, seeded by league position. The quarterfinal and semifinal rounds were best-of-five, while the final expanded for the first time from its traditional best-of-five format to best-of-seven.

Notes and references

External links
 Serie A official website 

Lega Basket Serie A seasons
1
Italy